Hasa of Eshtemoa was an amora active in Eshtemoa in the Land of Israel during the end of the 3rd-century or beginning of the 4th-century CE. He is mentioned once in the Jerusalem Talmud as being visited by Rav Yasa of Tiberias.

References 

Talmud rabbis of the Land of Israel